The Government of Aragon or Diputación General de Aragón represents the executive power of the community and its main headquarters is located in the Royal House of Mercy in Zaragoza, a building also called El Pignatelli. It has its historical origin in the Diputación del General del Reino de Aragón or Generalitat de Aragón, in force between 1364 and 1708, and whose origin is in the Cortes of 1188.

References

External links 

 Portal de Aragón: website of the Diputación General de Aragón